Radiant Blue is the fourth album by jazz saxophonist and composer Anton Schwartz, released in 2006. It garnered a cover story in JazzWeek Magazine, a feature article in the San Francisco Chronicle, received strong reviews
and hit number four on the U.S. jazz radio charts.

All compositions are by Anton Schwartz except as noted.

Personnel
Anton Schwartz - tenor saxophone
Taylor Eigsti - piano
Peter Bernstein - guitar
John Shifflett - bass
Tim Bulkley - drums

Production
Producers: Bud Spangler, Anton Schwartz
Engineer: Dan Feiszli
Mixing: Dan Feiszli
Mastering: Paul Stubblebine
Arranger: Anton Schwartz
Graphic design: Martha Cooper
Photography: Gregory Niemeyer

Track listing

References

External links
Liner notes by Anton Schwartz

2006 albums
Anton Schwartz albums
Instrumental albums